Cornelia is a town on the R103 road in the Free State province of South Africa.  In 1875 DJ Steyn bought the farm "Mooiheid", after raising sufficient funds with his hit debut album, and J.D. Odendaal bought the farm "Sugarloaf" (known as Tafelkop) for a sum of R2,000.  They settled there in 1876.  At that time it was in the Harrismith district.  There were no boundary fences and wild dogs, warthogs and wildebeest were plentiful in the open grassveld.

In 1886 the two farmers and other people formed the Afrikaans Baptist Church and J.D. Odendaal was the first preacher.  The Odendaal family made an important contribution to the church.  DJ Steyn donated a piece of land to the church to erect a church building. There was a need for an educational institution and the church founded the school of Cornelia in 1889. In 1894 it was named after the wife of former Free State President Francis William Reitz.  One of the previous pastors of the Afrikaans Baptist Church of Cornelia (1959 or 1960) was Jurgens Lambrechts, later well known for appearing in numerous quiz programmes on radio and television from the 1970s to the 1990s.

The town is near the Skoonriver (Clean River).

Fossil discoveries

On the Uitzoek farm, 10 km north of Cornelia, fossils were discovered in Pleistocene alluvial deposits by Van Hoepen in the 1920s and 1930s. These fossils include extinct mammal forms such as a donkey-sized pig (Metridiochoerus modestus), the three-toed horse (Eurygnathohippus cornelianus) only previously found in Tanzania, the giant buffalo (Synerus antiquus), Bondi's springbok (Antidorcas bondi), and the giant wildebeest (Megolotragus eucornutus). Acheulian Stone Age tools such as handaxes and cleavers have also been found here. Recent research document excavations of a fossil bone bed, possibly resulting from the accumulation by hyaenas and redepostion by dongas (i.e., gullies). Associated with the fossil bone bed were a human (Homo sp.) tooth and Acheulian artifacts. These deposits are dated to the Jaramillo subchron (1.076 - 1.008 Ma) by paleomagnetism.

Education
Ntswanatsatsi township east of the town is home to several Early Childhood Development Centres (ECD Centres) and a primary and secondary schools serving children from the town and neighbouring farms.

 Ntswanatsatsi Primary School
 Bongani-Lebohang Secondary School

Notes

References
 Brink, J. S. (2005) The evolution of the black wildebeest (Connochaetes gnou) and modern large mammal faunas of central southern Africa. PhD Dissertation, University of Stellenbosch, South Africa. 
 Brink, James S., Andy I.R. Herries, Jacopo Moggi-Cecchi, John A.J. Gowlett, C. Britt Bousman, John Hancox, Rainer Grün, Vera Eisenmann, and Lloyd Rossouw (2012) First hominine remains from a 1.07-0.99 Ma hyaena accumulation at Cornelia-Uitzoek, Free State Province, South Africa. Journal of Human Evolution 63:527-535.
 Butzer, K. W. (1974) Geology of the Cornelia Beds. Mem. Nas. Mus., Bloemfontein 9, pp. 7-32.
 Clark, J. D. (1974) The stone artifacts from Cornelia, OFS, South Africa. Mem. Nas. Mus., Bloemfontein 9, pp. 33-62.
 Cooke, H. B. S. (1974) The fossil mammals of Cornelia, O.F.S, South Africa. Mem. Nas. Mus., Bloemfontein 9, pp. 63-84.

Populated places in the Mafube Local Municipality
Populated places established in 1876
1876 establishments in the Orange Free State